Bariyarpatti (Nepali: बरियारपट्टी ) is a Rural municipality in Siraha District in Province No. 2 of Nepal. It was formed in 2016 occupying current 5 sections (wards) from previous 5 former VDCs. It occupies an area of 37.72 km2 with a total population of 25,256.

References

External links
UN map of the municipalities of  Siraha District

Populated places in Siraha District
Rural municipalities of Nepal established in 2017
Rural municipalities in Madhesh Province